Daniel Conrad Reber (February 20, 1872 in Pennsylvania – July 1962 in Indiana) is a former President of Elizabethtown College.

Reber served as president from 1902 until 1904, and again from 1909 until 1918.

References

1872 births
1962 deaths
Presidents of Elizabethtown College